Franklin Community High School is a community high school based in Franklin, Indiana. It is a part of Franklin Community Schools.

It serves almost all of Franklin and a small section of Bargersville.

About
Franklin Community High School was established on February 8, 1871, in a building located at Water and Adams Streets. Its current facilities were built in 2007. The school has an enrollment of more than 1,600 students.

Athletics
The school's athletic teams are named the Grizzly Cubs and the school's colors are blue and white. The school offers 11 boys sports: 

 Cross Country
 Football
 Soccer
 Tennis
 Basketball
 Swimming and Diving
 Wrestling
 Baseball
 Golf
 Track and Field
 Volleyball

and 10 girls sports:

 Softball
 Tennis
 Track and Field
 Volleyball
 Basketball
 Swimming and Diving
 Cross Country
 Golf
 Soccer
 Cheer
 Wrestling 

Their teams compete in the Mid-State Conference of the Indiana High School Athletic Association.

See also
 List of high schools in Indiana

References

1871 establishments in Indiana
Educational institutions established in 1871
Public high schools in Indiana